The Gypsy Lore Society was founded in Great Britain in 1888 to unite persons interested in the history and lore of Gypsies and rovers and to establish closer contacts among scholars studying aspects of such cultures.

History 
Another early member of the society was the explorer Sir Richard Burton, who wrote from Trieste in 1888: 

The Society had ceased to function during World War I. Robert Andrew Scott Macfie had set it up again round 1906 and John Sampson was its president of 1915. The Romani scholar Dora Esther Yates supported the society's revival in 1922 and she became its de facto secretary although this did not happen formally until 1932.

The Society also sponsors programmes and conferences. The North American chapter of the Society established the Victor Weybright Archives of Gypsy Studies in 1978, specialising in recent scholarly work on Gypsy, Traveller and related studies. This research collection is now housed at the University of Michigan.

The president of the Gypsy Lore Society from 2012 to 2020 was Elena Marushiakova. From 2020 the president of the Gypsy Lore Society is Tatiana Podolinska.

References

External links 
 Gypsy Lore Society 
 Romani Studies 
 Gypsy collections at the University of Liverpool
 Journal of the Gypsy Lore Society at HathiTrust

British culture
Romani in the United Kingdom
Romani studies
Romani folklore
1888 establishments in the United Kingdom
Academic organizations based in the United States